The following is a list of Mayors of Tallinn (before 1918 ), Estonia.

See also
 Timeline of Tallinn

External links
 Mayors of Tallinn

 List of mayors of Tallinn
Tallinn
Mayors

et:Tallinna linnapea#Linnapeade loend